Read Between the Lines, an idiom describing the inference of meaning or subtext, may refer to:

Music

Albums and videos
 Read Between the Lines (Aaron Tippin album) or the title song, 1992
 Read Between the Lines (KSM album) or the title song, 2009
 Read Between the Lines, by Avantgarde, 2005
 Read Between the Lines, a video by Boys Like Girls, 2008

Songs
 "Read Between the Lines" (Lynn Anderson song), 1987
 "Read Between the Lines", by Aaliyah from Aaliyah, 2001
 "Read Between the Lines", by Carole King from the 1982 album One to One
 "Read Between the Lines", by Dave Melillo, 2008
 "Read Between the Lines", by Deana Martin, 2013
 "Read Between the Lines", by Five Star from the 1987 album Between the Lines, 1987
 "Read Between the Lines", by the Fixx from the 1986 album Walkabout
 "Read Between the Lines", by Jerusalem from the 1983 album Vi Kan Inte Stoppas (Can't Stop Us Now)
 "Read Between the Lines", by Monie Love from the 1990 album Down to Earth
 "Read Between the Lines", by Rebbie Jackson from the 1988 album R U Tuff Enuff
 "Read Between the Lines", by Tim Feehan, 1984
 "Read Between the Lines", a song by Tom Cardy from the 2021 EP Artificial Intelligence

Television
 "Read Between the Lines" (Cold Case), an episode
 "Read Between the Lines" (Duet), an episode
 "Read Between the Lines" (Sidekicks), an episode
 Read Between the Lines, a game on the educational series Braingames

See also 
 Between the Lines (disambiguation)
 Read Between the Lies, a novel by Lori Bryant-Woolridge
 "Read Between the Lies", a song by Slayer from South of Heaven
 Reed Between the Lines, an American television family sitcom